Love Gantt, née Hirschmann (29 December 1875 – 16 November 1935), was an American physician.

Life
Love Rosa Gantt was born in Camden, South Carolina on 29 December 1875. Educated in the Charleston, South Carolina public schools, she graduated from the Medical College of South Carolina in 1901. She then trained at the New York Ophthalmic and Aural Institute under the supervision of Jacob Hermann Knapp, and the New York University Eye and Ear Clinic. Upon her return to South Carolina, she briefly became the staff physician at Winthrop College before leaving to marry Robert Joseph Gantt. She set up a private practice in 1905 in ophthalmology and otolaryngology and began a second career of public service. As president of the American Medical Women's Association, she persuaded their associated American Women's Hospitals Service to start a public health service in the southern Appalachians. Gantt served on the "South Carolina Board of Public Welfare for five years and was legislative chairman of the South Carolina Equal Suffrage League. A strong believer in preventive education, she organized and headed the Spartanburg Health League, the Spartanburg Anti-Tuberculosis Association, and the public health and legislation committees of the South Carolina Federation of Women’s Clubs." She traveled to the Woman's Hospital of Philadelphia for treatment and died there of an embolism on 16 November 1935.

Notes

References

1875 births
1935 deaths
Medical University of South Carolina alumni
American otolaryngologists
American women physicians
American ophthalmologists
Women ophthalmologists